Siridao, or Siridão, is a neighborhood located at the southern end of the city of Panaji, capital of the Indian state of Goa. It is completely located on the island of Tiswadi, one of the talukas in the state of Goa. At the entrance of the neighborhood, one can see three stone carved statues playing musical instruments with a dog. Here is preserved the testimony of a huge man like creature who once inhabited the place and who was locally nicknamed 'Paulist'.

Attractions

Jesus of Nazareth Chapel 
A chapel is found on a hilltop at Siridão. Annunciation of our Lady feast (Pejechem fest) is celebrated annually on the sunday following easter. Thousands of devotees come to the chapel to pay reverence to Lord Jesus.

Siridão beach 
Beach contains coarse sand and rocks and, is found at the mouth of Zuari river. Along the beach one can also find boats that are used by the local fishing community. The beach is a haven for shell collectors and one can easily find myriad types of shells here. It is located 7 km from the center of Panaji.

Caves 
Locals have discovered a centuries-old cave with a single cell carved out of stone stands at the foot of a jackfruit tree, barely 100 m west of the national highway.

Restaurants 
 Mi Casa Bar and Restaurant
 Leda Seashells

Hotels
 Neemrana's Cabana Dempo

Beach Cabin 
 4 corner's shack

Transportation 
Neighborhood can be easily accessed using two wheelers and four wheelers. Public buses run through the NH-17 which acts as a barrier between Palem, other half of Siridão. One can drop off at the bus stand and walk as no buses run through the neighborhood.

Population 
In 2011, Siridão had 2,417 residents.

References

Further reading
 

Neighbourhoods in Panaji
Beaches of Goa
Beaches of North Goa district